The  in E-flat major, 243a, also BWV243.1, by Johann Sebastian Bach is a musical setting of the Latin text of the Magnificat, Mary's canticle from the Gospel of Luke. It was composed in 1723 and is in twelve movements, scored for five vocal parts (two sopranos, alto, tenor and bass) and a Baroque orchestra of trumpets, timpani, oboes, strings and basso continuo including bassoon. Bach revised the work some ten years later, transposing it from E-flat major to D major, and creating the version mostly performed today, BWV 243.

The work was first performed in Leipzig in 1723. In May that year Bach assumed his position as Thomaskantor and embarked on an ambitious series of compositions. The Magnificat was sung at vesper services on feast days, and, as suggested by recent research, Bach's setting may have been written for a performance on 2 July, celebrating the Marian feast of the Visitation. For a Christmas celebration the same or a later year, he performed it at the Nikolaikirche with the insertion of four seasonal movements.

As a regular part of vespers, the canticle  was often set to music for liturgical use. Bach, as some of his contemporaries, devotes individual expression to every verse of the canticle, one even split in two for a dramatic effect. In a carefully designed structure, four choral movements are evenly distributed (1, 4, 7, 11). They frame sets of two or three movements sung by one to three voices, with individual instrumental colour. The work is concluded by a choral doxology (12), which ends in a recapitulation of the beginning on the text "as it was in the beginning". In Bach's Leipzig period, Magnificat is the first major work on a Latin text and for five vocal parts.

Background

Bach's beginning in Leipzig 

He had worked previously as an organist in Arnstadt, Mühlhausen and Weimar, where he was promoted to Konzertmeister (director of music) in 1714. From 1717 to 1723 he held a secular position at the court of Köthen. He applied for the post in Leipzig on 7 February 1723, performing two cantatas written for the audition on Estomihi or Quinquagesima, the last Sunday before Lent. In April he was accepted for the post, which he assumed on the first Sunday after Trinity, presenting a new cantata in 14 movement, Die Elenden sollen essen, BWV 75, on 30 May. A week later he led the new cantata , again in 14 movements. The feast of the Visitation, celebrated always on 2 July, was a few weeks later the first Marian feast day of his tenure in Leipzig.

Magnificat 

The canticle , one of three New Testament canticles, has long been a regular part of the liturgy in daily vesper services. After the Reformation, Martin Luther kept the Magnificat in the liturgy. He provided a German translation of the canticle, "Meine Seele erhebt den Herren" (which Bach used as the basis for his chorale cantata Meine Seel erhebt den Herren, BWV 10). However, the Latin text was also permitted in Lutheran worship. The canticle was often set to music. Contemporary extended settings include works by Heinichen and by Vivaldi.

Bach had an audience familiar with the text and its background. In Leipzig, a Latin Magnificat was sung on the high holidays (Christmas, Easter and Pentecost, then performed on two of the three days of celebration) and on the three Marian feasts Annunciation, Visitation and Purification. According to some scholars, further feast days included New Year's Day, Epiphany, Feast of the Ascension, Trinity Sunday, St. John's Day and St. Michael's Day, and the vespers before the feast days.

Composition history 

For the occasion, he presented the Magnificat as his first work on a Latin text and his first five-part choral setting in Leipzig. Otherwise, he used five voices in the funeral motet , the Missa in B minor, composed in 1733 for the court of Dresden, from which he derived the derived cantata , and in the Mass in B minor. Richard D. P. Jones notes: "Without exception these works lie outside the normal routine of Bach's sacred vocal works".

Bach probably first performed the Magnificat on the feast day, 2 July. Until 2003, most musicologists believed that Bach wrote the Magnificat for his first Christmas in Leipzig. Then Andreas Glöckner published Bachs Es-Dur-Magnificat BWV 243a – eine genuine Weihnachtsmusik? (Bach's Magnificat in E-flat major, BWV 243a – a genuine Christmas music?) in the Bach-Jahrbuch (Bach yearbook) 89, questioning the Christmas date in favour of Visitation the same year. Older sources naturally still have Christmas as the first performance, for example Neil Jenkins, the editor of an edition for Novello in 2000. He writes that the "new Thomaskantor was obviously intending to impress his new employer and the congregation", which makes even more sense at the beginning of Bach's tenure. Not all scholars follow Glöckner's arguments, but Jones agrees with Glöckner: "... may well have received its first performance at the Feast of the Visitation on 2 July 1723, only five weeks after he took up his Leipzig post."

For Christmas the same year, Bach performed his Magnificat with four inserted , songs of praise related to Christmas, partly in German, partly in Latin.

A year later Bach composed for the feast of the Visitation the chorale cantata , BWV 10, based on the German Magnificat. The musicologist Alberto Rizzuti compared the two settings which were possibly performed in one service on 2 July 1724.

For Visitation of 1733, Bach revised his Magnificat, creating the version better known today. In that version, transposed to D major, the laudes interpolations were abandoned. Limited differences in instrumentation include replacing the recorders by flutes and including these in the tutti movements. Changes in musical texture were even smaller, mellowing the harmony near the end of the Omnes generationes movement being the most noticeable.

Bach's son Carl Philipp Emanuel Bach followed the example of an extended setting, composing a Magnificat in nine movements in 1749, at the end of his father's life.

Music

Scoring and structure 
Bach scored the work festively. The autograph reads: "J.J. Magnificat à 3 Trombe Tamburi 2 Hautb. Basson. 2 Violini. Viola 5 Voci è Continuo", translating to: Jesu Juva ("Jesus, help!") / Magnificat for three trumpets, timpani, two oboes, bassoon, two violins, viola, five voices, continuo). The five voices are two sopranos (SI, SII), alto (A), tenor (T) and bass (B)). The instruments of the Baroque orchestra are listed in the first publication by Simrock in 1811 as "due violini, due oboe, tre trombi, tamburi, basson, viola e basso continuo", i.e. two violins, two oboes, three trumpets (in E-flat), timpani (E-flat and B-flat), bassoon, viola and basso continuo. Two recorders (flauto dolce) are required for aria No. 9 Esurientes.

Movements 

Bach structured the text in eleven movements for the canticle (Luke 1:46–55), concluded by a twelfth doxology movement. Each verse of the canticle is assigned to one movement, except verse 48, beginning with a soprano solo in the role of Mary (third movement), then switching to the fourth movement sung by the chorus when "all generations" are mentioned. The structure, alternating choral and solo movements, is similar to "contemporary Italian concerted settings of the Magnificat". The four Christmas hymn movements are placed after the second, fifth, seventh and ninth movement on the Magnificat text.

Choral movements are evenly distributed in the structure, numbers 1, 4, 7, and 11 within the canticle, and the concluding doxology as movement 12. Choral movements 1, 7 and 12 are accompanied by the full orchestra, with the exceptions of the recorders which add specific colour only in movement 9. The movements for one to three solo voices are accompanied by an obbligato instrument or only strings or even only continuo, as in Bach's church cantatas. In two consecutive solo movements, the second one is often in richer scoring. The work contains, other than typical cantatas on Baroque poetry, no da capo arias. Similar to the first two Leipzig cantatas, BWV 75 and BWV 76, it is a complex structure of rather short movements.

The following table shows the title, voices and instruments, time, key and text sources for the twelve movements for Visitation and the inserted movements for Christmas. Note that the timpani are no wind instruments but always go with the trumpets. The basso continuo is not listed, playing almost throughout. The first Christmas chorale is a four-part setting with no continuo. In Suscepit Israel, the lowest line played by violins and viola in unison has been described as a bassett and an "unusual continuo". The last column, Dig, provides a link to the Bach Digital database, for more details such as scoring and the text. The Christmas interpolations are highlighted in colour, as are the choral movements, the movements with trumpets, and those movements of the canticle that are in major mode.

The twelve movements of the Magnificat canticle

1 

The opening movement  (My soul magnifies the Lord) is performed by all voices and all instruments except the recorders. The instruments present the material with almost continuous runs in the upper parts, octaves and broken triads in the bass. The sopranos enter first, in third parallels: they sing the first word "" (literally: makes great) with a melisma on the first syllable, ending in a figure like a trill, then a stressed dotted note on the stressed syllable "gni", and relaxing on "ficat". The motif is abbreviated to a "fanfare figure" of just four notes, a low upbeat followed by three same notes, with the first one dotted. The sopranos sing it twice, reaching first E-flat, then G. The interplay of the fanfare and the melismas shapes the movement.  One measure after the sopranos, alto and tenor begin to imitate the sopranos, another measure later, the bass adds the short motif as an octave up. The text remains  for most of the movement.  After the voices conclude with "", the instruments close in a shortened version of their opening.

2 

 (And my spirit rejoices in God my Saviour) is an aria, as an image of personal celebration, sung by soprano II, accompanied by the strings. The major-mode and motifs of joy in the instruments illustrate the exultation.  (And exults) begins with a broken upward triad followed by a rest, suggesting a minuet.  (my spirit) is a sequence of 16th notes, two for every syllable. Longer melismas illustrate  (salvation).

A note in the autograph requests the insertion of the first Christmas interpolation here: "" (Here follows the chorale).

3 

 (For He has regarded the lowliness [of His handmaiden.]
 is an aria sung by soprano I with an obbligato oboe. Looking at the humility, the aria contrast to the preceding one in slow movement and the minor mode. Hogwood writes: "Humility is a downwards gesture, and so everything takes a long, s-shaped movement downwards, with a little rise at the end", and comments that the use of limited resources of one wind instrument and the voice have "a subservient feel to it." "All the phrases turn upwards" in what Hogward describes as "an internalised dialogue", expecting that "nobody in the church would have been expecting the sudden burst of 'omnes'".

4 

The continuation of the verse and completion of the sentence,  (by all generations) is given to the chorus, expressing the fullness of the praise. Hogwood compares the "crowd effect" to Bach's the crowds in Bach's Passions. The movement is a fugue which follows the stretto principle from the start and throughout. Beginning in measure 10, the voices enter, again half a measure apart, with the bass beginning. From measure 15, every entrance is one note higher, covering an octave as a symbol of completeness (omnes), again in the fast succession of half a measure: A, SII, SI, T, B, SII, SI, A. In a final sequence beginning in measure 21, the voices enter from bottom to top on the same note, only one beat apart. After a "very triumphal, but unfinished, chord" and a general pause, the movement concludes repeating the theme in homophony. Steinberg comments that Bach took the idea of separating the two words from the rest of the verse from earlier models, but filled it with an "exciting sense of drama" by the piled-up entrances in a "tremendous march across key after key", leading to "tense dissonances", finally a "dramatic pause" before the last statement.

5 

 (For the Mighty One has done great things for me) is an aria sung by the bass, accompanied only by the continuo. The motif, again beginning with repeated notes, is introduced by four measures of the continuo, then repeated by the voice. God's might shows in the bass voice and the dominant key of B-flat major.

A note in the autograph requests the insertion of the second Christmas interpolation here: "" (Hereon follows ).

6 

 a progenie in progenies, timentibus eum (His mercy is for those who fear Him from generation to generation) begins in great contrast softly with undulating movement in 12/8 time, played by the violins. It is a duet of alto and tenor, beginning in parallels of sixths and staying in homophony for most of the movement. The theme resembles the sarabande of Bach's first French Suite in D minor, BWV 812. Hogwood compares the music to the pastoral sinfonia beginning Part II of Bach's Christmas Oratorio, "creating a romantic, soft-edged, almost comforting sound". Jones remarks that " (who fear him) is "full of pathos and built over a partly chromatic, quasi-ostinato bass", while the "divine quality of mercy is expressed in beatific parallel thirds of the violins in the ritornello".

7 

 (He has shown strength) shares key, scoring and dotted motifs with the first movement. Based on a continuo line of octaves and repeated 16th notes, strength is expressed by irregular coloraturas in one voice and homophonic simultaneous calls of the other voices. The tenor begins the coloraturas of four measures, followed by alto, SII, bass and SI, leading to the climax of the movement, two homophonic calls. The new text,  (He has scattered), appears in various voices as broken triads, juxtaposed to material from the first section, but then isolated, in a sequence from the highest voice to the lowest and in downward triads. Joes describes: "... the fugue is dispersed ('dispersit') in favour of a highly graphic, dramatic portrayal of the words 'He has scattered ...'". The conclusion,  (in the thoughts of their hearts), is marked Adagio and illustrates the text in pompous long chords, with accents in the trumpets. Hogwood notes that Bach shows "complete imagination" in "very strange, incomplete yet wonderful harmonies", the trumpet playing their highest available note as an image of "rich people's hearts, who have been misled by worldly promises".

A note in the autograph requests the insertion of the third Christmas interpolation here: " " (Here belongs the ).

8 

 (He has brought down the powerful) is an aria for tenor, accompanied by only the violins (and continuo) united in powerful unison. The instrumental ritornello of 14 measures presents the material. The first motif, later sung on "", begins with a short upbeat and a long note, followed by a straight downward scale and a final leap up, while the continuo presents a broken triad, straight upward one octave. The second motif, later sung on "", begins with an upbeat of three 16th, followed by a rhythmic pattern which expands both the lowest as the highest note, while the continuo moves in steady steps down. For the third motif, sung on "" (from their thrones), the continuo picks up the rhythm of the second motif, while the violins play a more ornamented downward motion in sixteen continuous 16th. A fourth motif is a sequence of three measures, each a sequence of a figure of a figure of four 16th which is slowly moving upwards. When the singer takes over, the violins accent the end of each motif one to three by a broken downward triad.

The second thought of the verse, "" (and lifted up the lowly), is sung without introduction as a melisma of four measures, which includes downward runs but in a steadily rising sequence and ending similarly to the sequence of motif four, on "", but a modest downward line on "" (the lowly). After a shorter ritornello, the tenor sings the complete text again, the first part in a slightly modified version, but the exaltation considerably expanded. Nonetheless, the ritornello in full length is repeated at the end.

9 

 (He has filled the hungry with good things) is sung by the alto, accompanied by two recorders which may symbolise the need of the hungry. Bach used recorders also in his later cantata . They often play in parallels of sixths and thirds. The continuo is plucked in "the emptiest sound", even on the last note, on which the recorders are silent.

A note in the autograph requests the insertion of the fourth Christmas interpolation here: " " (Hereon follows ).

10 

 (He has helped His servant Israel) is scored for an unusual combination of the three highest voices, violins and violas in unison and trumpet. The text continues  (in remembrance of His mercy). The  played by the trumpet is the melody of the traditional setting of Luther's German version of the Magnificat, a ninth psalm tone variant. The strings, as the only other instruments, play repeated notes in every measure, moving one step down or up in the next. The voices imitate each other, also in gentle movement, the first a fifth up in a long upbeat, the second a fifth down one measure later, the third up again, another measure later, described as "scale themes". In contrast, the second idea of the verse, is on a "disjunct theme". It has been interpreted as a symbol of the cross, because a line drawn from the first to the fourth note crosses one from the second to the third. Jones assumes that the "bassett" of the unison strings symbolizes the divine quality of mercy.

11 

 (According to the promise He made to our ancestors), the last line of the Magnificat canticle, is written in stile antico, the old style of the musical "fathers", as a strict fugue, one voice following the other as one generation follows the other. The theme has four distinctly different measures: the first repeated notes, the second flowing eighth notes, the third quarter notes in leaps, the fourth half notes leaping up a sixth. The countersubject has leaps down and up an octave in the second measure, the flowing eighth notes in the third measure. When the theme is developed the first time, four voices enter from bottom to top. In the second development, soprano I begins, followed by alto, tenor and bass. The movements ends with a more homophonic section in which the bass has the theme once more, while soprano I sings long suspended notes covering almost an octave down. Hogwood sees Bach alluding to his musical "forefathers": "He portrays, in a very square fugue, exactly how square he thought the forefathers of German music were. Four bars follows four bars, each voice coming in predictably and on time, all according to the rulebook, unimaginative and extremely dull!"

12 

The work is concluded by the doxology,  (Glory to the Father), performed by the ensemble in two parts. The first part addresses the Trinity. Glory is given three times. Bach shapes the movement again as a "crowd" scene.  is first presented as the major chord repeated three times, with a dotted note on the first syllable.

The second part,  (as it was in the beginning) repeats material from the beginning of the work but shortened, as a frame. Jones points out that the "wittiness" of it was already used by Monteverdi.

Jones remarks that Bach observes a pattern of a bipartite structure of firstly contrasting homophonic blocks and "florid triplet rhythms", secondly "a lighter, quicker conclusion in triple time".

The four Christmas interpolations 
The four hymns Bach inserted in the Magnificat for the Christmas vespers had a tradition in Leipzig. A setting by Bach's predecessor Kuhnau in a Christmas cantata is extant. They can be connected to scenic display of the Christmas story, representing the annunciation to the shepherds, first by one angel (A, B), then by the multitude (C), finally a cradle song (Kindleinwiegen, D). In Bach's autograph, the four movements are grouped at the back of the volume. They are written in older musical styles than most of the Magnificat movements.

A 
 (From heaven on high I come here) is the first stanza of a hymn by Martin Luther, "", a paraphrase of the Annunciation to the shepherds. It is set for four parts in E-flat major and alla-breve as an a cappella motet, with the soprano singing the melody in long notes, the lower voices in imitation of the motifs.

B 
In polyphony on an independent basso continuo, with pairs of voices in parallels, it resembles a setting by Sethus Calvisius, a former Thomaskantor.

C 
 (Glory to God in the highest) is set for SSATB and violins in E-flat major, on the text from the Christmas story, the Annunciation to the Shepherds. It is written in "chordal fashion", a style found in Giacomo Carissimi, Johann Schelle (also a Thomaskantor) and Kuhnau, among others.

D 
 (The branch of Jesse flowers) is an "operatic" duet for soprano and bass in F major in 12/8 time. The text is part of a longer hymn, beginning like Virga Jesse floruit. Only the first 30 measures of this movement are extant.  Bach used the music again in 1725 on a different text in his Christmas cantata Unser Mund sei voll Lachens, BWV 110, from which the missing part can be deducted. It was Alfred Dürr who noticed the similarity of the continuo parts of both pieces.

Reception history

Publication 

The earliest sources are autographs for the performances on 2 July and 25 December 1723, including the Christmas parts, kept by the Staatsbibliothek zu Berlin.

The score of the E-flat major version of Bach's Magnificat was first published by Simrock in 1811, edited by Georg Pölchau, however without the Christmas hymns. These were published in 1862, in the appendix of Volume 11/1 of the Bach-Gesellschaft Ausgabe, a publication that contained the D major version of the Magnificat (and not the E-flat major version).

The Neue Bach Ausgabe published the E-flat major version in 1955, edited by Alfred Dürr. Novello published an edition in 2000, edited by Neil Jenkins. Bärenreiter published a critical edition based on Dürr's 1955 edition again in 2014/15.

Recordings 

Bach composed the work for five soloists: two sopranos, alto, tenor and bass. The soloists are listed in the table in the order SATB. For some recordings, only one soprano soloist is listed. Recordings with orchestras on period instruments in historically informed performances are highlighted. The first recordings in the 1960s combined the version in D major (BWV 243) with transposed Christmas interpolations. The type of orchestra is shown for an ensemble with period instruments in historically informed performance by green background.

The first recording by Rilling, of the D major version with Christmas interpolations, with a performance time of 40:06, was reissued under the title Christmas Magnificats, and also issued in comparison to a recording of the Magnificat in D by Kurt Thomas under the title Compare. Gönnenwein's D major recording with Christmas interpolations appeared on a CD titled J. S. Bach: Cantatas 142, 65 & Magnificat.

The Leipziger Weihnachtskantaten recording by the Collegium Vocale Gent, conducted by Philippe Herreweghe, was reviewed as with "bracing but not rushed tempos, infectiously energetic and technically solid contributions from the chorus, and an intelligently paced flow from movement to movement." The Guardian wrote: "Herreweghe's accounts are typically thoughtful, not at all theatrical or dramatically driven, and that slightly laid-back approach takes the edge off the Magnificat too, though the quality of the solo and choral singing, and the careful shaping of the orchestral lines are all exemplary."

In 2015 John Butt and the Dunedin Consort released a recording of the E-flat major version in the context of a reconstructed Christmas service as it might have been heard in Leipzig in 1723. The recording includes organ music and congregational hymn singing.

References

Sources 

Scores
 
  (Note: Virga Jesse incomplete)
 
  
 (1955) Neue Ausgabe sämtlicher Werke, Series 2: Messen, Passionen und oratorische Werke, Volume 3: Magnificat: erste Fassung in Es-Dur BWV 243a, zweite Fassung in D-Dur BWV 243, edited by Alfred Dürr. Kassel, Bärenreiter, 1955.
 (1959) Magnificat Es-dur: Herausgegeben von Alfred Dürr, Taschenpartituren No. 58. Bärenreiter, 1959.
 
 (2014) 

Books
 
 
 
 
 
 
 
 

 

Online sources

 
 
 
 
 
 
 
 
 
 Bach, Johann Sebastian.

External links 
 
 
 
  Manuscript of BWV 243.
 

Compositions by Johann Sebastian Bach
1723 compositions
Bach
Compositions in E-flat major